This is a list of television programs broadcast by the U.S. cable television channel Discovery Family.

Current programming 
This is a list of television programs currently broadcast by Discovery Family.

Acquired programming

Animated series

Programming from Discovery

Repeats of ended series

Animated series

Live-action series

Specials

Upcoming programming

Acquired programming

Animated series

Former programming 
This is a list of programs that have formerly aired on Discovery Kids (1996–2010), The Hub Network (2010–2014), and Discovery Family (2014–present).

Original programming

Animated series

Reality series

Comedy series

Drama series

Game shows

Variety series

Documentary series

Preschool series

Short series

Acquired programming

Animated series

Live-action series

Programming from Discovery

Former specials

Former programming blocks

Notes

References 

Discovery Family
Discovery Family shows